1,5-Bis(diphenylphosphino)pentane is an organophosphorus compound with the formula C29H30P2. It can be prepared by reacting 1,5-dibromopentane with lithium diphenylphosphide, or diphenylphosphine in presence of caesium hydroxide. It reacts with copper(I) iodide to give a luminescent dinuclear complex [CuIPh2P(CH2)5PPh2]2.

References 

Diphosphines
Phenyl compounds